Varin-e Bala (also Romanized as Varīn-e Bālā; also known as Vār, Var-e Bālā, Var-e ‘Olyā, Varīn, Varīn-e ‘Olyā, and Vīr) is a village in Khurheh Rural District, in the Central District of Mahallat County, Markazi Province, Iran. At the 2006 census, its population was 482, in 171 families.

References 

Populated places in Mahallat County